Mongolization is a cultural and language shift whereby populations adopt Mongolian language or culture. Kazakhs in Mongolia went through partial Mongolization. 

In addition, in history, such as Ongud, Keraites, Naimans and Merkits were Mongolized Turks. Tanguts, who speak Sino-Tibetan language but later became Mongolian, can be given as an example.

See also
 De-Sinicization
 Sinicization
 Turkification

References 

Cultural assimilation